Nicholas Shackell (also Nick) (born 31 October 1974) is a former freestyle swimmer from Great Britain.

Swimming career
Nicholas competed in the 100 metre freestyle at the 1996 Atlanta Olympics, finishing 28th fastest overall. He finished 8th as a member of the relay squad in the final of the 4×100 metre freestyle relay, but the 4×100 metre medley relay team was disqualified in the preliminaries.

He represented England winning three bronze medals in the relay events, at the 1994 Commonwealth Games in Victoria, British Columbia, Canada. Four years later he represented England again and won a silver and bronze in the relay events, at the 1998 Commonwealth Games in Kuala Lumpur.

He won the 1994 British Championship in 100 metres freestyle.

See also
 List of Commonwealth Games medallists in swimming (men)

References

1974 births
Living people
Olympic swimmers of Great Britain
British male swimmers
Commonwealth Games medallists in swimming
Commonwealth Games silver medallists for England
Commonwealth Games bronze medallists for England
Swimmers at the 1994 Commonwealth Games
Swimmers at the 1998 Commonwealth Games
Swimmers at the 1996 Summer Olympics
British male freestyle swimmers
People educated at Millfield
Medallists at the 1994 Commonwealth Games
Medallists at the 1998 Commonwealth Games